, also known as , was a Japanese samurai of the Sengoku period.  He was known as one of the "Twenty-Four Generals of Takeda Shingen". 
When Takeda Shingen took Fukashi castle (now Matsumoto Castle) in 1550, he entrusted it to Baba.

War Experience 
Baba fought in the Kawanakajima campaigns, and led the Takeda army that besieged and destroyed Katsurayama, a major Uesugi clan stronghold in 1557. In 1573, he took part in the Battle of Mikatagahara, during which the troops under his command chased Tokugawa Ieyasu's army back to Hamamatsu fortress; upon seeing the gates open and braziers lit, Baba mistakenly suspected a trap, and did not press the fleeing army further. Following Takeda Shingen's death, Baba served his successor Takeda Katsuyori.

Knowing Nobunaga's participation in the Battle of Nagashino, he advised Katsuyori to withdraw but Katsuyori rejected the idea. He led the Takeda army's right-wing, and was killed in combat during that engagement. It is said that he served to cover the retreat and let Katsuyori go out of the battlefield. The deaths of Baba Nobuharu, Sanada Nobutsuna, Naito Masayo, Yamagata Masakage, and other brave warriors of Shingen's reign in the Battle of Nagashino led to the weakening of the Takeda family and its destruction in 1582.

Character 
According to records, he was in charge of the Suwa area in Shinano from around 1553. This was a border area with the northern Daimyo, and was a defensive base to monitor invasions from the north. He was also an intermediary for the Shiina family of Etchu.

In 1562, he was allowed to take the name of "Mino no Kami", the guardian of Mino, in honor of Hara Toratane, a former "Mino no Kami" who had retired the previous year, and changed his name to Baba Mino no Kami Nobuharu.The Kōyō Gunkan states that Shingen often consulted Nobuharu on important matters. Prior to Nagashino, Nobuharu was reputed to have fought in 70 battles without receiving a single wound. For this reason, he is known today as "Baba Mino the Immortal" or "Oni Mino the Immortal".

References

Further reading
Turnbull, Stephen (1998). The Samurai Sourcebook. London: Cassell & Co.

External links 
  "Legendary Takeda's 24 Generals" at Yamanashi-kankou.jp

1575 deaths
Samurai
Japanese warriors killed in battle
Takeda retainers
Year of birth unknown